The Mid-Prairie Community School District is a rural public school district in southeastern Iowa, headquartered in Wellman, Iowa.  The district spans areas of Washington, Iowa, and Johnson counties, and serves three communities and the surrounding area: Wellman, Kalona, and West Chester.

Schools

Mid-Prairie High School
Mid-Prairie High School (MPHS) is located at 1634 Hwy 22, one mile east of Wellman, Iowa, approximately 18 miles south of Iowa City and 15 miles north of Washington.  MPHS is a grades 9–12 high school with approximately 380 students.

The school colors are black and gold and the athletic teams are known as the Golden Hawks, and they compete in the River Valley Conference.

Athletics
Baseball - 2004 State Champions 
Girls' Basketball - 2002 State Champions
Boys' Track and Field - 2008 State Champions

Mid-Prairie Middle School
Mid-Prairie Middle School is a grades 5–8 school located at 713 F Avenue in Kalona, Iowa, approximately 18 miles south of Iowa City and 15 miles north of Washington. Since the start of the 2017–18 school year this has been the only school in the district for grades 5–8, with approximately 440 students,

Mid-Prairie West Elementary
Mid-Prairie West Elementary is a K and grades 3 and 4 elementary school located at 800 6th Avenue Wellman, Iowa. The school was built in 1979.

Mid-Prairie East Elementary
Mid-Prairie East Elementary is a K-2 elementary school located at  702 6th Street Kalona, Iowa.

See also
List of school districts in Iowa
List of high schools in Iowa

References

External links
 Mid-Prairie Community School District

School districts in Iowa
Education in Washington County, Iowa